Morrinsville Recreation Ground is a cricket ground in Morrinsville, Waikato, New Zealand. The first recorded cricket match held on the ground came in 1980 when Thames Valley played Bay of Plenty in the 1975/76 Hawke Cup.  The ground later held a first-class match in the 1986/87 Shell Trophy when Northern Districts played Central Districts.  A second first-class match was held there in the 1988/89 Shell Trophy when Northern Districts played Wellington.  First-class cricket hasn't been played there since.  A single Youth One Day International was held there in 1988 when New Zealand Under-19s played India Under-19s.

References

External links
Morrinsville Recreation Ground at ESPNcricinfo
Morrinsville Recreation Ground at CricketArchive

Cricket grounds in New Zealand
Sports venues in Waikato
Morrinsville